Asociația Sportivă CFR Brașov, commonly known as CFR Brașov, was a football club from Brașov, Romania. 

The club was founded in the year 1921 as CFR Brașov (Brașov Romanian Railway Association).

They played in the first edition of 1933–34 Cupa României, beating Jiul Petroșani in the first round. They were eliminated in the second round after losing to UD Reșița. 

In the edition of 1934–35 Cupa României, they were eliminated in the first round by Ripensia Timișoara. In the edition of 1935–37 Cupa României, they were eliminated in the first round by Crișana Oradea. In the season 1936–37 Divizia B East Series, they finished second in the league and were promoted to 1937–38 Divizia A.

CFR Brașov was dissolved in the spring of 2013, after 93 years of existence, due to financial problems. Viteziștii vișinii were the oldest club from Brașov County.

Performances
Played in Divizia A (1) : 1937–38.

References

External links
 Official Website 
 Rsssf.com
 Rsssf.com

Defunct football clubs in Romania
Sport in Brașov
Football clubs in Brașov County
Association football clubs established in 1921
Association football clubs disestablished in 2013
Liga I clubs
Liga II clubs
Liga III clubs
Liga IV clubs
1921 establishments in Romania
2013 disestablishments in Romania